A mnemonic is an underlined alphanumeric character, typically appearing in a menu title, menu item, or the text of a button or component of the user interface. A mnemonic indicates to the user which key to press (in conjunction with the Alt key) to activate a command or navigate to a component.

In Microsoft Windows, mnemonics are called "Access keys". In Web browsers, Access keys may or may not be engaged by the Alt key.

The usage of mnemonics in languages other than English is limited to the possibility of entering the underlined character using a single key stroke; for this reason, localized versions of software omit letters that have diacritics which are input via dead keys.

See also 
 Keyboard shortcut

References

External links 
SUN's definition of mnemonic term
Keyboard shortcuts and mnemonics or accelerators are not the same thing
Mnemonics (keyboard) (book)

User interfaces
User interface techniques
Computer keyboards